Ohad Benchetrit is a Canadian musician. He plays guitar, bass, saxophone and flute for the post-rock band Do Make Say Think, and has also contributed to albums by Broken Social Scene, Feist, The Hidden Cameras and Charles Spearin.

He collaborated in a project called Sphyr, which released one album, A Poem for M, in 2003.

Ohad released his first solo record on May 5, 2009 on the Arts & Crafts label under the name Years.
Ohad shares score credit for the movie Braven (2018).

Discography
 Years (2009)

References

External links
Years

Living people
Canadian indie rock musicians
Jewish Canadian musicians
Do Make Say Think members
20th-century Moroccan Jews
Canadian people of Moroccan-Jewish descent
Arts & Crafts Productions artists
Broken Social Scene members
20th-century Canadian guitarists
21st-century Canadian guitarists
20th-century Canadian bass guitarists
21st-century Canadian bass guitarists
Year of birth missing (living people)
Canadian Screen Award winners